"I'm Gonna Drive You Out of My Mind" is a single by Canadian country music artist Charlie Major. Released in 1993, it was the first single Major's debut album, The Other Side. The song reached #1 on the RPM Country Tracks chart in September 1993.

Chart performance

Year-end charts

References

1993 singles
Charlie Major songs
Songs written by Charlie Major
Songs written by Barry Brown (Canadian musician)
1993 songs
Canadian Country Music Association Single of the Year singles
Canadian Country Music Association Song of the Year songs